KOGM (107.1 FM) is a radio station licensed to Opelousas, Louisiana, United States, and serving the Lafayette area.  The station is currently owned by Delta Media Company.  KOGM's studios are located on Evangeline Thruway in Carencro, and its transmitter is located northeast of Lafayette.

History
On June 12, 2012, KOGM changed their format from classic hits (as "Kool 107.1" to hot adult contemporary, branded as "Mix 107.1".

On August 1, 2014, KOGM flipped to a simulcast of Classic Country KXKW-LP as Mustang 87.7/107.1.

On November 1, 2015, KOGM rebranded as "Mustang 107.1", after dropping the simulcast with KXKW-LP.

References

External links

Radio stations in Louisiana
Classic country radio stations in the United States
Opelousas, Louisiana